Tandula Dam is located in Chhattisgarh in India. It is located at about 2 km from Balod Collectorate in Balod district. 
The dam project was started in 1910 on the confluence of Tandula and Sukha Nala rivers and was completed in 1921. Its Designed Area is 25397 Hact. The Dam provide Drinking Water to Durg & Bhilai Nagar Nigam area and caters to industrial requirement of Bhilai Steel Plant.
Tandula river joins the ShivNath river.

References 

Dams in Chhattisgarh
Dams completed in 1923
Balod district
1923 establishments in India
20th-century architecture in India